The finals and the qualifying heats of the Men's 100 metres Breaststroke event at the 1997 FINA Short Course World Championships were held on the second day of the competition, on Friday 18 April 1997 in Gothenburg, Sweden.

Finals

Qualifying heats

See also
1996 Men's Olympic Games 100m Breaststroke
1997 Men's European LC Championships 100m Breaststroke

References
 Results

B